Gay Scotland was an LGBT magazine created by the gay rights organisation, the Scottish Homosexual Rights Group (SHRG). The magazine grew out of SHRG's internal newsletter and its first issue was published in March 1982. The magazine was originally edited by Ian Dunn who remained as editor for several years.

The magazine was an important source of information for LGBT readers across Scotland. Through the HIV/AIDS epidemic it provided its readers with contemporary debates around HIV and AIDS, to keep them informed on latest healthcare developments and to debunk myths.

As the first publication of its kind in Scotland, Gay Scotland went on to inspire future publications produced specifically for the LGBT community.

A complete run of Gay Scotland can be found at the National Library of Scotland and an almost complete run can also be found at Lothian Health Services Archive in the collection of the Lothian Gay and Lesbian Switchboard.

See Also 
LGBT Rights in Scotland

List of LGBT periodicals

LGBT movements

References 

LGBT-related magazines published in Scotland
Magazines established in 1982
1982 establishments in Scotland